The original Franciscan mission, Nuestra Señora de la Concepción del Socorro, was founded in 1682 by the Franciscan order, to serve displaced Spanish families, American Indians (the Piro, Tano and Jemez) from New Mexico, who fled the central New Mexico region during the Pueblo Revolt. The present Socorro Mission was constructed around 1840 to replace an earlier 18th-century mission destroyed in 1829 by flooding of the Rio Grande. The mission, constructed of adobe surfaced with stucco, is particularly notable for its interior. The finely painted and decorated beams, or vigas, are from the 18th-century mission and were reused when the present church was constructed. The massing, details and use of decorative elements of the Socorro Mission show strong relationships to the building traditions of 17th-century Spanish New Mexico.

The Socorro Mission is located at 328 S. Nevarez Rd. south of El Paso on I-10 at Moon Rd. and FM 258.

A full-size replica of the Socorro Mission was featured in El Paso's exhibit in the 1936 Texas Centennial celebration, at the Cotton Bowl in Dallas.  It was later dismantled and rebuilt as St. Anthony Church in Dallas.

See also 

Ysleta Mission
Hueco Tanks
Mission Nuestra Señora de Guadalupe
Town of Ysleta, El Paso, Texas
National Register of Historic Places listings in El Paso County, Texas
Recorded Texas Historic Landmarks in El Paso County

References

External links

 National Park Service site
 El Paso Diocese: La Purísima Parish–Socorro Mission
 Socorro Mission Preservation Project - El Paso County

1682 establishments in the Spanish Empire
Spanish missions in Texas
National Register of Historic Places in El Paso County, Texas
Buildings and structures in El Paso County, Texas
Tiwa Puebloans
Tourist attractions in El Paso County, Texas
Roman Catholic churches in Texas
Properties of religious function on the National Register of Historic Places in Texas
Texas State Antiquities Landmarks
Recorded Texas Historic Landmarks